Inzhavinsky District  is an administrative and municipal district (raion), one of the twenty-three in Tambov Oblast, Russia. It is located in the east of the oblast. The district borders with Kirsanovsky District in the north, Turkovsky District of Saratov Oblast in the east, Uvarovsky District in the south, and with Rzhaksinsky District in the west. Its administrative center is the urban locality (a work settlement) of Inzhavino. Population: 23,184 (2010 Census);  The population of Inzhavino accounts for 41.4% of the district's total population.

People
 Nikolay Annenkov (1899-1999)

References

Notes

Sources

Districts of Tambov Oblast